= 2012 South Korean prosecutor sex scandal =

Political scandal in South Korea

Prosecutor sex scandal is a sex scandal in South Korea where the male investigating prosecutor had several sexual encounters with the female suspect under duress. The scandal caused a flurry of media reporting and shocks to the public trust of the justice system.

== Facts ==
=== Female suspect ===
On October 10, 2012, Suspect ("S") is a housewife who has been charged by Seoul Gangdong Police for 16 counts of theft of 4 million Korean Won worth of clothing, shoes and frozen products in one discount store by removing RFID tag in the toilets or fitting rooms which were recorded by the CCTV. She had been arrested for the similar charge in August of the same year. She told the police that her five-year-old daughter was sexually assaulted at the kindergarten and received a psychological therapy with her daughter but the trauma caused her kleptomania and submitted a medical record from the psychiatrist. The police, given that she was raising three children and had a history of psychiatric treatment, investigated her without arrest and sent her file to the Prosecutors Office in Eastern District of Seoul for indictment. She has been represented by an attorney-at-law, Chulseong Jung.

=== Prosecutor ===
The prosecutor was a married, 30-year-old man who graduated from Seoul National University with a degree in electrical engineering. He then received a law degree from a top private law school in Seoul. He passed the patent bar when he was only 20, the youngest person to do so in that year.

== Facts ==
S was summoned to the prosecutor's office on Saturday when there was no one in the room. S alleges that she cried for the fear of prosecution and the prosecutor, consoling S at first, moved to initiate sexual acts which led to sexual intercourse. Later, the prosecutor called S and met near the office and took her to his car. S alleges that he again forced her to perform oral sex on him which she resisted at first, saying that others are seeing and she complied. He took S to a motel near Wangsipli and had sex again and made sure she did use contraceptives.

== Repercussions ==
In November 2012, the Prosecution Service was under public criticism due to recent bribery scandal involving high ranking prosecutor. The news broke out and created a huge public uproar. The case is unique because the prosecutor was barely one year in service just out of law school. It has a damaging effect on the public trust on the justice system in Korea.
